The history of the German Cavalry in World War I is one of an arm in decline.

Pre-war 

The peacetime Imperial German Army was organised as 25 Corps (Guards, I - XXI and I - III Bavarian) each of two divisions (1st and 2nd Guards, 1st - 42nd and 1st - 6th Bavarian).  Each division included a cavalry brigade (of two regiments) numbered as their parent division with the following exceptions:
The Guards Corps had four cavalry brigades organised as the Guards Cavalry Division, the only peacetime cavalry division in the Army
The Leib Hussar Brigade was assigned to 36th Division and there was no 36th Cavalry Brigade
Three corps had an extra cavalry brigade:
43rd Cavalry Brigade attached to 2nd Division of I Corps
44th Cavalry Brigade attached to 12th Division of VI Corps
45th Cavalry Brigade attached to 34th Division of XVI Corps
This gave a total of 55 brigades and 110 regiments.

A complete list of the pre-war regiments, their peacetime corps assignments and garrisons is shown here.

Mobilisation 
On mobilisation, the pre-war cavalry brigades were withdrawn from their divisions (as detailed below).  33 brigades (66 regiments) were used to form the 11 cavalry divisions.  The remaining 22 brigades (44 regiments) were broken up and their regiments were employed as divisional cavalry for the 50 active divisions.  This necessitated 6 regiments being raised to a strength of 6 squadrons before being split into two half-regiments of 3 squadrons each.  The regiments involved were:
 3rd Hussars assigned as divisional cavalry to 5th & 6th Divisions of III Corps
 10th Hussars assigned as divisional cavalry to 7th & 8th Divisions of IV Corps
 16th Uhlans assigned as divisional cavalry to 13th & 14th Divisions of VII Corps
 16th Dragoons assigned as divisional cavalry to 17th & 18th Divisions of IX Corps
 17th Hussars assigned as divisional cavalry to 19th & 20th Divisions of X Corps
 6th Cuirassiers assigned as divisional cavalry to 22nd & 38th Divisions of XI Corps
The other active regiments had a strength of 4 squadrons.

33 Reserve Cavalry Regiments, 2 Landwehr Cavalry Regiments and an Ersatz Cavalry Regiment were also formed and assigned to field formations.  Each of these had a strength of 3 squadrons. Finally, there were 38 Landwehr squadrons (assigned to the mixed Landwehr brigades) and 19 Ersatz detachments (assigned to the mixed Ersatz brigades).

Regiments 

The 110 active regiments were assigned to the Field Army on mobilisation.  Each regiment formed a depot squadron which remained in Germany and took 4 squadrons into the field.  6 regiments were brought up to a strength of 6 squadrons and split into two half regiments; they joined the two divisions of their Corps.  33 Reserve Regiments, 2 Landwehr Regiments and 1 Ersatz Regiment also joined the Field Army, but were only at a strength of 3 squadrons.

Cavalry Divisions 

In September 1916, the establishment of cavalry regiments within the Cavalry Divisions was reduced to 675 horses instead of 769.  The Supreme Command did not stop there, but also took away the horses of entire regiments and used them as infantry. These regiments were redesignated as Cavalry Schützen Regiments (as detailed below).  By the end of the war, just 22 Cavalry Regiments remained mounted, a fifth of the active regiments mobilised in 1914.

Divisional Cavalry 
A measure was put into force through the War Ministry at the beginning of August 1916 whereby every division and autonomous brigade in the Army of the West was to command just one squadron of cavalry.  The measure also came into force immediately in the Army of the East.  The Landwehr and Ersatz formations, together with the individual squadrons and Reserve Detachments set up during the war for the new divisions were dissolved.

For the cavalry regiments allocated as individual squadrons to the divisions, the regimental unit ceased to exist for all practical purposes.  The Regimental Staffs were not dissolved, but were for the most part left with the divisions they happened to find themselves with, to be used for special purposes.  16 Regimental Commanders found new employment as horse inspectors; two Regimental Staffs were changed into Infantry Regiment Staffs; and three Regimental Staffs were changed into Jäger Regiment Staffs.

By the end of war, about 250 individual mounted squadrons remained, representing 61 active and 22 reserve cavalry regiments.

Nomenclature 
Although the various regiments were divided into a number of different categories (cuirassiers, dragoons, hussars, uhlans, etc.) all had the same role. Regiments bore a number within its category, a state (or province in the case of Prussian regiments) and usually an honour title.  For example,
6th (Brandenburg) Cuirassiers "Emperor Nicholas I of Russia" was the 6th regiment of cuirassiers, from the Prussian Province of Brandenburg and named for Tsar Nicholas I of Russia
26th (2nd Württemberg) Dragoons "King" was the 26th regiment of dragoons, the 2nd one drawn from the Kingdom of Württemberg
21st (3rd Royal Saxon) Uhlans was the 21st regiment of uhlans (lancers) and the 3rd from the Kingdom of Saxony

Bavarian regiments were numbered in a separate sequence, so 1st Royal Bavarian Uhlans "Emperor William II, King of Prussia" was distinct from 1st (West Prussian) Uhlans "Emperor Alexander III of Russia"

Uniquely amongst cavalry regiments, the 7th Dragoon Regiment was awarded an honour title during the war (on 23 September 1917) and was thereafter 
7th (Westphalian) Dragoons "Generalfeldmarschall Prince Leopold of Bavaria".

Brigades 
33 pre-war brigades were used to form the 11 cavalry divisions.  The remaining 22 brigades were broken up (only the 39th Cavalry Brigade was reconstituted) and their regiments were used to form the divisional cavalry for the 50 pre-war infantry divisions.  Other than these, only a handful of other Cavalry Brigades were formed:
Provisional Guards Cavalry Brigade operated in the East from 5 January 1915 to 12 November 1916
Siebenbürg Cavalry Brigade formed for the Romanian Campaign out of the remnants of the dissolved 3rd Cavalry Division, later renamed 7th Bavarian Cavalry Brigade
4th Landwehr Cavalry Brigade as the 4th Landwehr Division was the only division to mobilise with two cavalry regiments
All other Cavalry Brigades named for their commanders were temporary formations and merely consisted of reinforced cavalry regiments, for example Cavalry Brigade Kaufmann under the Staff of 6th Uhlans.

By the end of the war, just 10 cavalry brigades remained as mounted formations:
2nd Cavalry Brigade with 1st Cavalry Division
17th Cavalry Brigade autonomous in the East
22nd Cavalry Brigade with 2nd Cavalry Division
23rd Cavalry Brigade autonomous in the East
25th Cavalry Brigade with 2nd Cavalry Division
Leib Hussar Brigade autonomous in the East
1st Bavarian Cavalry Brigade with Bavarian Cavalry Division
4th Bavarian Cavalry Brigade autonomous in the East
5th Bavarian Cavalry Brigade with Bavarian Cavalry Division
7th Bavarian Cavalry Brigade autonomous in the Caucasus
The rest had been dissolved, converted to Cavalry Schützen Commands, or formed mixed units in Russia and the Ukraine.

Divisions 

The German Army constituted 11 cavalry divisions at the outbreak of war - the existing Guards Cavalry Division and 10 more formed on mobilisation.  Each consisted of 3 cavalry brigades (6 regiments each of 4 squadrons), a horse artillery Abteilung (3 four-gun batteries), a machine gun detachment (company size, 6 MGs), plus pioneers, signals and a motor vehicle column.  A more detailed Table of Organisation and Equipment can be seen here.

Apart from the opening actions of the war, the use of these divisions as proper cavalry was only possible in the offensive in Courland and on Vilna in 1915, for a short time in Romania, and in 1918 in support of the Ukraine.  Most of the time they were used as infantry.

The increasing shortage of horses led to the 4th, 5th and 9th Cavalry Divisions being dismounted in October 1916.  The 3rd Cavalry Division was dissolved in November 1916 and the 6th and 7th Cavalry Divisions were also dismounted in November 1917.  The Guards Cavalry Division followed in March 1918.

The dismounted divisions were converted to Cavalry Schützen Divisions.  Here, the cavalry brigades were renamed Cavalry Schützen Commands and performed a similar role to that of an infantry regiment command.  Likewise, the cavalry regiments became Cavalry Schützen Regiments and allotted the role of an infantry battalion and their squadrons acted as infantry companies.  However, these units were much weaker than normal infantry formations (for example, a Schützen squadron had a strength of just 4 officers and 109 NCOs and other ranks, considerably less than that of an infantry company). However, the 5th, 8th and 9th Cavalry Divisions were dissolved before conversion to Schützen.

By the end of the war, there were only 3 Cavalry Divisions in the East (1st, 2nd and Bavarian with just 5 brigades between them) and 4 Schützen Divisions in the West (Guards, 4th, 6th and 7th though the 4th was more akin to a Landwehr Division).

Corps 

On mobilisation, the German Army formed 4 Cavalry Corps for the Western Front (just a single Cavalry Division was operating in the East).  Initially, each simply consisted of 2 or 3 Cavalry Divisions without any Corps troops; in supply and administration matters, the Cavalry Divisions were entirely autonomous.  The Cavalry Corps were entitled Höhere Kavallerie-Kommando (HKK - Higher Cavalry Command) and the commander was only concerned with tactics and strategy, hence his title of Senior Cavalry Commander Höherer Kavallerie-Kommandeur.

By the beginning of 1915, with the solidifying of the trench system, they could no longer find employment on the Western Front.  II and IV Cavalry Corps were dissolved and I and III Cavalry Corps were transferred to the East.  With less use as pure Cavalry formations, each underwent a series of redesignations according to their particular role from time to time.  Two new Corps were formed in June 1915 (V and VI Cavalry Corps) as a gap opened between the Army of the Niemen and 10th Army during the Courland offensive.  With the conclusion of the offensive, all four Cavalry Commanders were assigned sectors of the front and thus took on the functions similar to a normal Corps and were reorganised in a similar fashion.  Therefore, for the Romanian Campaign, none of the existing Cavalry Corps were brought in, instead a new temporary Cavalry Corps was set up in Transylvannia (Cavalry Corps "Schmettow").

Finally, all the Cavalry Corps were redesignated as General Commands for Special Use Generalkommandos zur besonderen Verwendung (Genkdo z.b.V.) and were indistinguishable from other Corps (56th-59th and 65th Corps (z.b.V.)).

End of the War 
By the end of the war
all the Cavalry Corps had been redesignated as General Commands for Special Use (Genkdo z.b.V.) and were indistinguishable from other Corps
of 11 Cavalry Divisions, just 3 remained in the East (and 4 Schützen Divisions in the West)
just 10 Cavalry Brigades remained as mounted formations
22 Cavalry Regiments remained mounted, just a fifth of the active regiments mobilised in 1914
a further 27 active regiments and 5 war-formed regiments continued to serve as Cavalry Schützen Regiments
about 250 individual squadrons remained mounted as divisional cavalry; they represented 61 active and 22 war-formed regiments

As the war ended, the regiments marched back to Germany and dissolved as the troops reached their home towns.  A number of regiments were perpetuated as squadrons of the post-war Reichswehr.

See also 

Bavarian Army
German Army (German Empire)
German Army order of battle (1914)
Horses in World War I
List of Imperial German cavalry regiments
TOE, German Cavalry Division, August 1914

References

Bibliography 
 
 
 
 
 
 

Military administrative corps of Germany
Cavalry units and formations of Germany